Lochardil (/lɒx ardɪl/) (from the Scottish Gaelic: Loch Àrdail meaning the Church Lake) is a residential area in the West of Inverness. The area has an abundance of green spaces, notably MacDonald Park and Lochardil Woods.

The local school is Lochardil Primary, with most secondary age pupils attending Inverness Royal Academy. There is a pharmacy, a hairdresser and the Best Western Lochardil House Hotel. There are post boxes on Stratherrick Road and Morven Road.

As is the case in the rest of the City, a bus service is provided by Stagecoach Highlands who took over the route from Rapsons' in 2008 (Inverness Courier, 2008)  Buses to the city centre run approximately every 30 minutes Monday to Friday, with a reduced timetable in place at weekends.

References 

http://www.inverness-courier.co.uk/News/Hundreds-of-jobs-safe-despite-bus-merger-6135.htm

Areas of Inverness